Carlos Noriega Hope (1896–1934) was a Mexican writer and journalist. Born in Tacubaya, Mexico City, he studied law and became a journalist. In 1919 he traveled to Hollywood to report on the new cinematographic industry. Besides writing the scripts for important films such as Santa (Mexico 1932, Actors: Carlos Orellana, Mimi Derba, Lupita Tovar), based on the book by Federico Gamboa, and Una Vida por otra (One life for another, Mexico 1934),
he published several short stories where he pictured the early rise of Hollywood. The book was edited under the names "La inutil curiosidad" and "Las experiencias de Miss Patsy" (Para qué? – "Ché" Ferrati, inventor—El viejo amigo—Las experiencias de Miss Patsy—La grande ilusión—El tesoro de Cabeza de Vaca—Fracaso—El honor del ridículo)

He edited the literary journal El Universal Ilustrado,
which was crucial for the diffusion of Stridentism.

References

Further reading

External links
 Latin American Writers and the Rise of Hollywood cinema
 Noriega Hope at OpenLibrary.org
 "La grande ilusión" at La novela corta: una biblioteca virtual

Mexican male writers
Mexican screenwriters
1896 births
1934 deaths
Writers from Mexico City